The participation of Galicia  (Spain) in World War II was marked by its location on Spain's Atlantic coast.  Despite Spain's neutrality in the war, the country was affected due to its strategic location. The tungsten mines, such as the Mines of San Fins, were used for the Axis war industry. The extraction and transport of the mineral carried out by front companies, such as the Finance and Industrial Corporation (Galician: Sociedade Financeira e Industrial).

Hundreds of Galicians traveled to fight with the Germans on the Eastern Front, in the Blue Division.  On the other side, former republican combatants fought with the allies, many of them having been confined in French concentration camps.

Tungsten
Raw materials were vital in economic warfare.  Tungsten was one of those used to manufacture armaments.  Before the war, the main producers were China (36%), Burma (17%) and the United States of America (11%).  During the war, British sea power gave the Allied powers access to these countries, and denied them to the Axis powers.  Germany had to seek sources in Europe.  Spain and Portugal were the only producers, with Galicia accounting for almost 70% of Spanish reserves.  This made it the focus of the Wolfram Crisis.

Lorenz beam 

In 1939, the Germans built a  aerial, in Arneiro in the municipality of Cospeito. The station had two repeating lower and auxiliary buildings. 

It formed part of a German network of nineteen stations.  The Allies' sabotage plans were not carried out, since Spain was treated as a neutral country.  The Lorenz beam was also eventually used by the British and Americans.

See also
 Spain during World War II

References

Mediterranean theatre of World War II
Francoist Spain
20th century in Galicia (Spain)
Spain in World War II